Fadiadougou (also spelled Fadyadougou) is a town in north-western Ivory Coast. It is a sub-prefecture of Kani Department in Worodougou Region, Woroba District.

Fadiadougou was a commune until March 2012, when it became one of 1126 communes nationwide that were abolished.

In 2014, the population of the sub-prefecture of Fadiadougou was 15,066 In 2014,.

Villages
The nine villages of the sub-prefecture of Fadiadougou and their population in 2014 are:
 Bafritou (2 948)
 Banandjé (2 295)
 Batogo (833)
 Djélisso (2 103)
 Fadjadougou (4 697)
 Lipara (778)
 Massasso-Senoufo (119)
 Migniniba (775)
 Minigninidéni (518)

Notes

Sub-prefectures of Worodougou
Former communes of Ivory Coast